Asim Škaljić (born August 9, 1981) is a Bosnian-Herzegovinian retired professional footballer who played as a centre-back and sometimes as a right-back.

Club career
In between two spells at hometown club Velež Mostar Škaljić played in Switzerland. He was snapped up together with Almir Pliska by Olimpik in December 2010 and he joined Željezničar in summer 2013 but left them for another stint at Velež in January 2014.
He then left Velež for a third time in his career in 2016, when he moved to second tier GOŠK Gabela.

International career
He made one appearance for Bosnia and Herzegovina, coming on as a second half substitute for Zlatan Bajramović in an August 2002 friendly match against Serbia and Montenegro.

Honours

Player

Club
Sion
Swiss Cup: 2006

References

External links

1981 births
Living people
Sportspeople from Mostar
Association football defenders
Bosnia and Herzegovina footballers
Bosnia and Herzegovina international footballers
FK Velež Mostar players
FC Sion players
FC Chiasso players
FK Olimpik players
FK Željezničar Sarajevo players
NK GOŠK Gabela players
Premier League of Bosnia and Herzegovina players
Swiss Super League players
Swiss Challenge League players
First League of the Federation of Bosnia and Herzegovina players
Bosnia and Herzegovina expatriate footballers
Expatriate footballers in Switzerland
Bosnia and Herzegovina expatriate sportspeople in Switzerland